Surabaya Kota Station is a railway station in Bongkaran, Pabean Cantikan, Surabaya, East Java, Indonesia. The local people usually call it Semut Station.

History

Located at the center of the city, the station is also the oldest railway station in Surabaya, built in 1875 and opened in 1878. The station has two buildings, the old building is located at the north-east of the newer building, whereas the new building is located at the end of the tracks. The historic old building was demolished because of mall building near the station, but the mall building process was stopped because it didn't have a building license, and the old building has been protected and chosen as one of the heritages in Surabaya.

The station still using mechanical signals to preserve its classical style and has two signal boxes near the exit signal. The station was very strategic, it is located near a market that is the one of the most famous markets in Surabaya, Pasar Atum, it also located near Sunan Ampel's tomb.

There are many train car shunting activities, especially at the morning and the evening when many trains are departing and arriving at the station. The station doesn't have a locomotive depot, the locomotive depot is located at Sidotopo station located at north-east of the station.  station is located at south-east of the station about three kilometers far. Uniquely these three stations formed a triangle shaped railway, but the railway between Surabaya Kota with Surabaya Gubeng is a double tracked railway, the others are Single Tracks.

Services
Passenger trains that use this station are :

Economy Class

Commuter and Local Train
Dhoho from and to  via 
Penataran from and to  via 
Tumapel from 
Ekonomi Lokal Kertosono from and to 
Komuter Surabaya–Bangil from and to 
Komuter Surabaya–Sidoarjo from and to 
Komuter Surabaya–Pasuruan from and to 
Jenggala from and to

Gallery

References

External links
 

Railway stations in Surabaya
Cultural Properties of Indonesia in East Java
Railway stations opened in 1878